Erdentempel is the fourth studio album by German folk metal band Equilibrium. The album contains the band's first song in English, titled "The Unknown Episode". It is the last album featuring inputs by founding members and siblings Andreas Völkl and Sandra Van Eldik, who decided to leave the band prior to its release – they did not perform on the album, which had every instrument recorded by René Berthiaume alone.

Track listing

Personnel
Equilibrium
Robert "Robse" Dahn – vocals
René Berthiaume – guitars, keyboard, clean vocals, production, bass, drums

References

2014 albums
Equilibrium (band) albums
Nuclear Blast albums